Onslaught is a board game published in 1987 by TSR.

Contents
Onslaught is a game in which the efforts of the Allies' push from the Normandy beaches in June 1944 to the crossing of the river Rhine ten months later, are depicted.

Reception
Norman Smith reviewed Onslaught for Games International magazine, and gave it 5 stars out of 5, and stated that "This game is just what the hobby needs at the moment: a solid design that serves as an excellent introductory game and also a superb game for regular wargamers. It plays well solitaire and can be played in an evening."

Reviews
 Casus Belli #46 (Aug 1988)

References

Board games introduced in 1987
TSR, Inc. games